The Connors River is a river and anabranch located in Central Queensland, Australia.

Formed by the confluence of the Collaroy Creek and Whelan Creek, east of the settlement of Lotus Creek, the headwaters of the river rise below the Chinaman Ridges in the Great Dividing Range. The river flows generally west past Mount Bridget where the river veers south and crosses the Marlborough-Sarina Road and then forms a series of braided channels and continues generally south by southwest. Crossing Bar Plains the river forms even more channels then discharges into the Isaac River at several locations north of the Junee National Park. From source to mouth, the river passes through a series of lagoons and waterholes including the Boat Hole, Main Camp Lagoon, Lotus Creek, Lake Plattaway and Knobbys Waterhole. The river descends  over its  course.

The river was named in honour of Daniel Conner, a pastoralist, by Augustus Gregory in 1856. Gregory was an explorer and Surveyor General of Queensland.

See also

References

Rivers of Queensland
Central Queensland